Emil Weber Meek (born August 20, 1988) is a Norwegian professional mixed martial artist that competes in the Welterweight division of Konfrontacja Sztuk Walki (KSW). He previously fought in the UFC's Welterweight division. He is currently ranked #7 in the KSW Welterweight rankings.

Background
Meek grew up in Nesna in Nordland, and later lived in Mosjøen, Trondheim and Oslo. In 2009, Meek started his mixed martial arts (MMA) career at the now defunct, Trondheim Fight Gym. Emil Meek runs MMA Trondheim together with Thomas Formo.

Mixed martial arts career
Meek began his MMA career as an amateur, where he compiled an undefeated record (6-0).

Meek made his professional debut on March 12, 2011, against Magnus Frekman. Meek defeated Frekman via TKO 45 seconds into the first round. For his second fight, he fought Mohammed Abdallah. He lost the bout by TKO in the first round. After this loss, Meek went on a four-fight win streak. He was awarded 2013 Prospect of the Year by MMA Viking.

On August 20, 2016, he won the Venator Fighting Championship Welterweight title by defeating Rousimar Palhares by knockout in the first round. Meek stopped Palhares with a series of punches and elbows to the side of the head, while defending from Palhares' takedown attempt.

Ultimate Fighting Championship
On December 10, 2016, Meek made his promotional debut against returning veteran Jordan Mein at UFC 206. He won the fight via unanimous decision.

Meek was expected to face Nordine Taleb on May 28, 2017, at UFC Fight Night 109. However, Meek pulled out of the fight on May 12 citing injury. Meek was replaced by promotional newcomer Oliver Enkamp.

Meek was scheduled to faced Kamaru Usman on December 30, 2017, at UFC 219. However, the fight was rescheduled for January 14, 2018 at UFC Fight Night: Stephens vs. Choi. He lost the fight by unanimous decision.

Meek faced Bartosz Fabiński on July 22, 2018, at UFC Fight Night 134. He lost the fight via unanimous decision.

Meek faced Jake Matthews on February 23, 2020, at UFC Fight Night: Felder vs. Hooker. He lost the fight via unanimous decision.

On June 17, 2021, it was announced that Meek was released from the UFC.

Post-UFC career
After the release, Meek was scheduled to face Thibault Gouti at Ares FC 2 on December 11, 2021. Gouti pulled out of the bout and was replaced by Louis Glismann. He lost the fight via an armbar in round one.

Meek faced Kacper Koziorzębski on September 10, 2022 at KSW 74, winning the bout via ground and pound TKO in the second round.

Championships and accomplishments
Venator Fighting Championship
Venator Welterweight Championship (One time; former)
Nordic MMA Awards: MMAViking.com
2013 Prospect of the Year
2016 Fighter of the Year

Mixed martial arts record

|-
|Win
|align=center|10–6 (1)
|Kacper Koziorzębski
|TKO (punches)
|KSW 74: De Fries vs. Prasel
|
|align=center|2
|align=center|2:02
|Ostrów Wielkopolski, Poland
|
|-
|-
|Loss
|align=center|9–6 (1)
|Louis Glismann
|Submission (armbar)
|Ares FC 2
|
|align=center|1
|align=center|1:00
|Paris, France
|
|-
|Loss
|align=center|9–5 (1)
|Jake Matthews
|Decision (unanimous)
|UFC Fight Night: Felder vs. Hooker 
|
|align=center|3
|align=center|5:00
|Auckland, New Zealand
|
|-
|Loss
|align=center|9–4 (1) 
|Bartosz Fabiński
|Decision (unanimous)
|UFC Fight Night: Shogun vs. Smith 
|
|align=center| 3
|align=center| 5:00
|Hamburg, Germany
|
|-
|Loss
|align=center|9–3 (1)
|Kamaru Usman
|Decision (unanimous)
|UFC Fight Night: Stephens vs. Choi
|
|align=center|3
|align=center|5:00
|St. Louis, Missouri, United States
|
|-
|Win
|align=center| 9–2 (1)
|Jordan Mein
|Decision (unanimous)
|UFC 206
|
|align=center|3
|align=center|5:00
|Toronto, Ontario, Canada
|
|-
|Win
|align=center| 8–2 (1)
|Rousimar Palhares
|KO (punches and elbows)
|Venator FC 3: Palhares vs. Meek
|
|align=center|1
|align=center|0:45
|Milan, Italy
|
|-
|Win
|align=center| 7–2 (1)
|Christophe Van Dijck
|TKO (punches)
|Battle of Botnia 2015
|
|align=center|2
|align=center|4:35
|Umeå, Sweden
|
|-
|Win
|align=center| 6–2 (1)
|Kai Puolakka
|Submission (guillotine choke)
|Cage 32
|
|align=center|3
|align=center|2:20
|Helsinki, Finland
|
|-
|Loss
|align=center| 5–2 (1)
|Albert Odzimkowski
|TKO (punches)
|Fight Exclusive Night 8: Summer Edition
|
|align=center|1
|align=center|3:30
|Kołobrzeg, Poland
|
|-
| NC
| align=center| 5–1 (1)
| Piotr Danielski
| NC (overturned)
| Berserkers Arena 7: Exped Cup
| 
| align=center| 3
| align=center| 5:00
| Szczecin, Poland
|
|-
|Win
|align=center| 5–1
|Per Franklin
|TKO (punch)
|Superior Challenge 9
|
|align=center|2
|align=center|1:40
|Goteborg, Sweden
|
|-
|Win
|align=center| 4–1
|Tato Primera
|TKO (punches)
|Strength and Honor Championship 8: Paraisy vs. Balde
|
|align=center|1
|align=center|0:50
|Geneva, Switzerland
|
|-
|Win
|align=center| 3–1
|Raymond Jarman
|TKO (punches)
|European MMA 5: Frederiksberg
|
|align=center|1
|align=center|N/A
|Copenhagen, Denmark
|
|-
|Win
|align=center| 2–1
|Frodi Vitalis Hansen
|TKO (punches)
|European MMA 4: Fight Time in Viborg
|
|align=center|1
|align=center|1:00
|Viborg, Denmark
|
|-
|Loss
|align=center| 1–1
|Mohammed Abdallah
|TKO (punches)
|Fighter Gala 25
|
|align=center|1
|align=center|4:33
|Frederiksberg, Denmark
| 
|-
|Win
|align=center| 1–0
|Magnus Frekman
|TKO (punches)
|Red Mist Promotions: Ultimate Rage 1
|
|align=center|1
|align=center|0:25
|Barnsley, England
| 
|}

References

External links
  
 

1988 births
Sportspeople from Trondheim
People from Nesna
Living people
 Norwegian male mixed martial artists
 Welterweight mixed martial artists
 Ultimate Fighting Championship male fighters